State Highway 3 (SH 3) is a short north–south state highway in La Plata County, Colorado, United States (almost entirely within the southern part of the city of Durango). It follows the former alignment of U.S. Route 160 (US 160) and U.S. Route 550 (US 550) south of downtown, lying across the Animas River from the modern highway constructed about 1980.

Route description
SH 3 begins in southern Durango at US 160/US 550 (Camino del Rio), just south of that route's crossing of the Animas River to the Durango Mall. After leaving and re-entering the city of Durango, SH 3 ends at Santa Rita Drive, which curves to the southwest before meeting US 160/US 550 about  later. The former alignment of US 160/US 550 does not use Santa Rita Drive, but instead continues north on East Eighth Avenue and turns west on College Drive to Main Avenue, where the two routes used to split.

History
A new alignment of US 160/US 550 was built in 1979-1980, crossing the Animas River twice south of downtown Durango. The old road east of the river was redesignated SH 3 in 1981-1982.

Major intersections

See also

 List of state highways in Colorado
 List of highways numbered 3

References

External links

Colorado Highways: Route 3

003
State Highway 003
Durango, Colorado
U.S. Route 160